Carlos Simon may refer to:
 Carlos Eugênio Simon (born 1965), former football referee from Brazil
 Carlos Simon (composer) (born 1986), black American composer
 Carlos Simon (gynaecologist) (born 1961), Spanish gynaecologist and obstetrician
 Carlos Simón, landscape designer of Palmetum of Santa Cruz de Tenerife